The 2012 Boundary Ford Curling Classic was held from November 30 to December 3 at the Lloydminster Curling Club in Lloydminster, Alberta as part of the 2012–13 World Curling Tour. The event was held in a triple knockout format, and the purse for the event was CAD$32,000, of which the winner, Renée Sonnenbergr, received CAD$8,000. Sonnenberg defeated Casey Scheidegger in the final with a score of 10–6.

Teams
Teams are listed as follows:

Knockout results
The draw is listed as follows:

A event

B event

C event

Playoffs

References

External links

Boundary Ford Curling Classic
Boundary Ford Curling Classic
Boundary Ford Curling Classic
Boundary Ford Curling Classic
Sport in Lloydminster
Curling competitions in Alberta